Ben Rice may refer to:

 Ben Rice (author) (born 1972), British author
 Ben Rice (producer), American record producer, songwriter and musician
 Ben Herbert Rice Jr. (1889–1964), United States federal judge